Castra is a rural locality in the local government area (LGA) of Central Coast in the North-west and west LGA region of Tasmania. The 2016 census recorded a population of 51 for the state suburb of Castra.

History 
Castra is a confirmed locality.

Geography
Most of the boundaries are survey lines.

Road infrastructure 
Route C124 (Central Castra Road) passes through from north to south.

References

Towns in Tasmania
Localities of Central Coast Council (Tasmania)